Jerome Hartigan (born 30 August 1957) is an Irish modern pentathlete. He competed at the 1980 Summer Olympics.

Early life and education
Hartigan was born on 30 August 1957, in Ireland. He earned his Master's degree from Ithaca College and later coached their Men's Varsity Swimming and Diving Team.

Career
Hartigan competed for Team Ireland at the 1980 Summer Olympics alongside Sackville Currie and Mark Hartigan. In 1988, Hartigan and Sophie Foster stablished Jumping Beans, a program to encourage brain development in pre-school aged children.

References

External links
 

1957 births
Living people
Irish male modern pentathletes
Olympic modern pentathletes of Ireland
Modern pentathletes at the 1980 Summer Olympics